Kickboxer 2 (stylized on-screen as Kickboxer 2: The Road Back) is a 1991 American martial arts film directed by Albert Pyun and written by David S. Goyer. The film is the second entry into the Kickboxer film series, and stars Sasha Mitchell in the role of David Sloan (unlike Sloane in the first film), the brother of Kickboxers lead character Kurt, portrayed by Jean-Claude Van Damme.

Plot
One year after the events of the first film, it is revealed that kickboxing brothers Kurt and Eric Sloane died shortly after Kurt's victory over Tong Po. David Sloan, the last surviving brother, struggles to keep the family's Los Angeles kickboxing gym afloat with his business partner, Jack. He offers free kickboxing lessons to local kids, often demonstrating a technique he calls the "rock and the river" which allows him to defend against attacks while blindfolded.

Although his will to compete has waned since the loss of his brothers, financial problems eventually force David to fight again in a new organization run by a crooked promoter, Justin Maciah. His surprising comeback ultimately attracts the attention of Po, who is revealed to have killed Kurt and Eric in revenge for his defeat.  With Kurt dead, Po seeks to defeat David in the ring and regain his honor. But when David announces his retirement after a victory against Neil Vargas, Po's manager Sanga (who is later revealed as helping to fund Maciah's kickboxing organization) hires a group of thugs to burn down the gym; Vargas goes with them to enact petty revenge for his defeat. Although David attempts to fight them off, he is beaten down and suffers a gunshot wound to the leg. The injury prevents him from aiding a young student trapped in the blaze, who dies as a result.

While recovering in the hospital, David is visited by Xian Chow, the Muay Thai Kru who trained his brother Kurt in Thailand. Though David initially wants nothing to do with him, he finally relents and allows Xian to nurse him back to health. Meanwhile, one of David's most promising students, Brian Wagner, has secured a championship bout and invites David to watch the fight. However, the champion is unexpectedly replaced by Po, as a part of a deal made between Maciah and Sanga. Tong Po pummels Wagner with illegal blows and kills him in the ring despite David's efforts to intervene. The bout leaves Justin in financial and professional ruin, while Sanga declares their partnership is over. Afterwards, Xian reveals to David that the main reason he is helping him is because Tong Po had also killed his niece Mylee along with David's brothers. He guiltily admits that part of him wants revenge for her death, and is willing to sacrifice David to get it.

Insisting that the fight is his own, David accepts Po's challenge. In a bloody bout reminiscent of the "ancient way" of fighting in Thailand, (using tape covered in resin and broken glass) David is beaten badly and has clouded vision. Utilizing his "rock and the river" technique, however, David gains the upper hand and ultimately defeats his rival. Having lost his honor, Sanga confronts David in the ring at gunpoint, but thanks to a distraction by his friend Jack, David is able to disarm and incapacitate him.

The next day, David unsuccessfully teaches Xian to drive a car. When his students introduce him to the new neighborhood bully, David once again demonstrates the "rock and the river", but the lesson is cut short when the ice cream truck arrives, and Xian treats the kids.

Cast
 Sasha Mitchell as David Sloan
 Peter Boyle as Justin Maciah
 Dennis Chan as Xian Chow, David's Muay Thai Kru
 Cary-Hiroyuki Tagawa as Sanga
 John Diehl as Jack
 Michel Qissi as "Tiger" Tong Po
 Heather McComb as Jo
 Vince Murdocco as Brian Wagner
 Vincent Klyn as Thai Thug
 Gene LeBell as The Referee
 Don Familton as Brian's Cornerman
 Matthias Hues as Neil Vargas
 Humberto Ortiz as Joey
 Emmanuel Kervyn as Kurt Sloane
 Casey Stengel as Eric Sloane
 Joe Restivo as The Ring Announcer
 Brian Austin Green as Tommy
 Brent Kelly as Carl
 Amy Arthur as Kristen Wagner
 Annie O'Donnell as Mrs. Wagner
 Robert Gottlieb as Lou Lescano
 Debrae Barensfeld as Maciah's Girlfriend
 Ed Anders as Brian's Opponent

Release

Theatrical
Kickboxer 2 was given a limited release theatrically in the United States by Trimark Pictures in June 1991, grossing $1,250,712 at the box office.

Home media
HBO Home Video released it on VHS and laserdisc the same year. In the Philippines, the film was released by Pioneer Films on July 4, 1991.

The film was released on DVD by Lionsgate in 2003.

Reception

Critical response
In comparison to the 1989 Van Damme original, the film was not initially well received. TV Guide opined: "From its opening moments it's obvious that Kickboxer 2 is struggling under the leaden weight of humorlessness. This is the movie that absolutely no one wanted to see: a kickboxing movie that takes itself dead serious".

References

External links

1991 films
1991 martial arts films
American martial arts films
American sequel films
Films directed by Albert Pyun
Films shot in Los Angeles
Films with screenplays by David S. Goyer
Kickboxer (film series)
Kickboxing films
Trimark Pictures films
1990s English-language films
1990s American films